Lake Louise (named Ho-run-num-nay (Lake of the Little Fishes) by the Stoney Nakota First Nations people) is a glacial lake within Banff National Park in Alberta, Canada.

Lake Louise is named after the Princess Louise Caroline Alberta (1848–1939), the fourth daughter of Queen Victoria and the wife of the Marquess of Lorne, who was the Governor General of Canada from 1878 to 1883.

The turquoise colour of the water comes from rock flour carried into the lake by melt-water from the glaciers that overlook the lake.

Fairmont's Chateau Lake Louise, one of Canada's grand railway hotels, is located on Lake Louise's eastern shore. It is a luxury resort hotel built in the early decades of the 20th century by the Canadian Pacific Railway.

Moraine Lake and Lake Agnes are also accessible from Lake Louise.

Activities 
A variety of hiking trails exist around the lake. Hiking trails include trips to Saddleback Pass, Fairview Mountain, Mirror Lake, Lake Agnes, Big Beehive, Little Beehive, Devils Thumb, Mount Whyte, and Mount Niblock.  Some of these trails are open to mountain biking and horseback riding, and the surrounding mountain faces offer opportunities for rock climbing.  Kayaking and canoeing are popular activities during summer, and a boat launch and rental facility are maintained on the north-eastern shore. 

The nearby Lake Louise Ski Area, formerly known as Lake Louise Mountain Resort, offers amenities for alpine and Cross-country skiing, as well as heli-skiing and snowboarding. The lake can be used for ice fishing and ice skating in winter, while the surrounding area offers settings for snowmobiling, dog sledding, snowshoeing and ice climbing.

See also 
 Lakes of Alberta

References

External links 

Banff National Park
Louise
Louise